Triptycene is an aromatic hydrocarbon, the simplest iptycene molecule with the formula C2H2(C6H4)3. It is a white solid that is soluble in organic solvents.  The compound has a paddle-wheel configuration with D3h symmetry.  It is named after the medieval three-piece art panel, the triptych.  Several substituted triptycenes are known.  Barrelenes are structurally related.  Due to the rigid framework and three-dimensional geometry, derivatives of triptycene have been well researched.

Synthesis
The parent triptycene was first prepared in 1942 by a multistep method. It can also be prepared in one step in 28% yield from the Diels–Alder reaction of anthracene and benzyne. In this method, benzyne is generated by the reaction of magnesium and 2-bromofluorobenzene.

Derivatives and applications
The hydrocarbon framework is very rigid and triptycene derivatives such as triptycene quinones are therefore incorporated in many organic compounds as a molecular scaffold for various applications, such as molecular motors or ligands.

For example, a bis(diphenylphosphino) derivative was used as a phosphine ligand on nickel in a highly selective hydrocyanation reaction of butadiene.

The reactivity of this catalyst is attributed to the large bite angle of the bidentate ligand supported by the triptycene framework.

References

External links  
 Triptycene MSDS
 Triptycene Dynamic molecular model

Polycyclic aromatic hydrocarbons